Mukhino is a rural locality on the north-eastern shore of the Roshchinka River, on Karelian Isthmus, in Vyborgsky District of Leningrad Oblast, served by the station 63rd km of the Saint Petersburg–Vyborg railroad.

Rural localities in Leningrad Oblast
Karelian Isthmus